Bora Öztürk (20 May 1955 — 6 August 1997) was a Turkish professional football player who played as a striker.

Career
Bora was a strong and tall striker, who began his senior career at Sakaryaspor in 1973. He followed that up with stints at Şekerspor, Göztepe, and Altay. He made his name for his successful tenure at Beşiktaş winning two Süper Ligs, and as the top scorer when on loan with Adanaspor in the 1980–81 1.Lig season. He finished his career with Zonguldakspor in 1988. He died of pharyngeal cancer in 1997.

International career
Bora made one appearance for the Turkey national football team in a 3-0 1982 FIFA World Cup qualification loss to the Soviet Union on 7 October 1981,

Honors
Beşiktaş
 Süper Lig: 1981-1982, 1985-1986

References

External links
  (as player)
 

1955 births
1997 deaths
People from Beykoz
Footballers from Istanbul
Turkish footballers
Turkey international footballers
Association football forwards
Süper Lig players
TFF First League players
Sakaryaspor footballers
Turanspor footballers
Göztepe S.K. footballers
Altay S.K. footballers
Beşiktaş J.K. footballers
Adanaspor footballers
Antalyaspor footballers
Zonguldakspor footballers